In telecommunications, a user–network interface (UNI) is a demarcation point between the responsibility of the service provider and the responsibility of the subscriber.  This is distinct from a network-to-network interface (NNI) that defines a similar interface between provider networks.

Specifications defining a UNI

Metro Ethernet Forum
The Metro Ethernet Forum's Metro Ethernet Network UNI specification defines a bidirectional Ethernet reference point for Ethernet service delivery.

Optical Internetworking Forum
The Optical Internetworking Forum defines a UNI software interface for user systems to request a network connection from an ASON/GMPLS control plane.

See also
 Network termination

External links
Metro Ethernet Forum

Network management